Jane Stidever (born 15 January 1966) is a retired Paralympic swimmer and equestrian. She competed in six Paralympics and won five gold medals. Stidever won her first Paralympic medals in 1984, representing Great Britain in both the swimming and the dressage. She did not continue with her equestrian success but went on to win four gold medals in swimming events between 1988 and 2004.

References

External links 
 

1966 births
Living people
British female equestrians
British female freestyle swimmers
Paralympic equestrians of Great Britain
Paralympic swimmers of Great Britain
Paralympic gold medalists for Great Britain
Paralympic silver medalists for Great Britain
Paralympic bronze medalists for Great Britain
Paralympic medalists in equestrian
Paralympic medalists in swimming
Equestrians at the 1984 Summer Paralympics
Swimmers at the 1984 Summer Paralympics
Swimmers at the 1988 Summer Paralympics
Swimmers at the 1992 Summer Paralympics
Swimmers at the 1996 Summer Paralympics
Swimmers at the 2000 Summer Paralympics
Swimmers at the 2004 Summer Paralympics
Medalists at the 1984 Summer Paralympics
Medalists at the 1988 Summer Paralympics
Medalists at the 1992 Summer Paralympics
Medalists at the 1996 Summer Paralympics
Medalists at the 2000 Summer Paralympics
Medalists at the 2004 Summer Paralympics
British female backstroke swimmers
S5-classified Paralympic swimmers
20th-century British women